Road Trips Volume 2 Number 1 is two-CD live album by the American rock band the Grateful Dead.  The fifth in their "Road Trips" series of albums, it was recorded at Madison Square Garden in New York City on September 18, 19, and 20, 1990.  It was released on December 10, 2008.

A third, "bonus" disc, recorded on September 18, 1990, was included with early shipments of the album.

Another Grateful Dead album recorded during the same run of concerts at Madison Square Garden is Dick's Picks Volume 9.

Track listing

Disc One

September 20, 1990

September 19, 1990

An excerpt of "Jam" was previously released on the CD accompanying Phil Lesh's memoir "Searching for the Sound" as "Trio Jam with Bruce Hornsby"

Disc Two

September 20, 1990

September 18, 1990

Bonus Disc
September 18, 1990
"Mississippi Half-Step Uptown Toodeloo" (Garcia, Hunter) – 9:34
"Picasso Moon" (Weir, Barlow, Bob Bralove) – 7:34
"To Lay Me Down" (Garcia, Hunter) – 9:43
"Eyes of The World" > (Garcia, Hunter) – 17:57
"Estimated Prophet" > (Weir, Barlow) – 12:59
"Foolish Heart" > (Garcia, Hunter) – 8:25
"Jam" (Grateful Dead) – 10:36
An edited version of "Jam" was previously released on So Many Roads (1965–1995) as "Jam Out of Foolish Heart"

Personnel

Musicians

 Jerry Garcia – lead guitar, vocals
 Mickey Hart – drums
 Bruce Hornsby – piano, accordion, vocals
 Bill Kreutzmann – drums
 Phil Lesh – electric bass, vocals
 Bob Weir – rhythm guitar, vocals
 Vince Welnick – keyboards, vocals

Production

Produced by Grateful Dead
Compilation produced by David Lemieux and Blair Jackson
Recorded by Dan Healy
Edited and mastered by Jeffrey Norman at Garage Audio Mastering, Petaluma CA
Cover art by Scott McDougall
Photos by Susana Millman and Bob Minkin
Package design by Steve Vance
Liner notes written by Dan Levy

Concert set lists

The complete set lists for the September 18, 19 and 20, 1990 concerts at Madison Square Garden were:

September 18, 1990:
First Set: "Mississippi Half-Step Uptown Toodeloo"**, "New Minglewood Blues", "Loser", "Picasso Moon"**, "Row Jimmy", "Loose Lucy", "Desolation Row", "To Lay Me Down"**, "Promised Land"
Second Set: "Eyes of the World"**, "Estimated Prophet"**, "Foolish Heart"**, "Jam"**, "Drums", "Space", "The Other One", "The Wheel", "Sugar Magnolia"
Encore: "Knockin' On Heaven's Door"*

September 19, 1990:
First Set: "Jack Straw", "Bertha", "Me & My Uncle", "Big River", "It Must've Been the Roses", "Stuck Inside of Mobile With the Memphis Blues Again", "Help on the Way", "Slipknot!", "Franklin's Tower"
Second Set: "Playing in the Band"*, "Ship of Fools"*, "Playing in the Band"*, "Uncle John's Band"*, "Let It Grow"*, "Jam"*, "Drums", "Space", "Goin' Down the Road Feeling Bad", "Stella Blue", "Around and Around"
Encore: "The Mighty Quinn (Quinn the Eskimo)"

September 20, 1990:
First Set: "Feels Like a Stranger", "Althea", "It's All Over Now", "Ramble On Rose", "El Paso", "Brown-Eyed Women", "Greatest Story Ever Told", "U.S. Blues"
Second Set: "Truckin'"*, "China Cat Sunflower"*, "I Know You Rider"*, "Man Smart, Woman Smarter", "Drums", "Space"*, "Dark Star"*, "Playing in the Band (reprise)"*, "Dark Star"*, "Throwing Stones"*, "Touch of Grey"*
Encore: "Turn On Your Lovelight"*

* appears on Road Trips Volume 2 Number 1 
** appears on bonus disc

References

Road Trips albums
2008 live albums
Albums recorded at Madison Square Garden